The Gordon S. Lang School of Business and Economics (formerly the College of Business and Economics) is the business school of the University of Guelph, in Guelph, Ontario.

After receiving a $21-million donation from Stu and Kim Lang, the College was renamed to the Gordon S. Lang School of Business and Economics on April 3, 2019, honouring Stu's late father. The current dean of the school is Lysa Porth, who was appointed in April 2020 for a 5-year term beginning on October 1, 2020.

Academics 
Gordon S. Lang School of Business and Economics offers a wide range of programs which also include co-operative education experiences. The School offers undergraduate, graduate and executive development programs as well as many courses through the University of Guelph's open learning office. Lang also offers all of the required courses for the Certified Human Resources Professional (CHRP) designation and Certified Management Accountant (CMA) certification. Their accounting program is certified by the Chartered Professional Accountant of Ontario (CPA) designation.

Undergraduate programs 
The undergraduate programs that are offered through Lang are:

Bachelor of Commerce Honours (B.Comm.)
 Accounting
Food and Agricultural Business
Government, Economics and Management 
Hospitality and Tourism Management 
Management
Marketing Management 
Real Estate
Sport and Event Management 
Undeclared (only available in semesters 1 and 2)
 Bachelor of Arts (B.A.)
 Economics

Minors 
The undergraduate minors that are offered through Lang are:

 Accounting
 Business Data Analytics
 Economics
 Entrepreneurship
 Human Resources
 International Business
 Marketing
 Project Management
 Sport and Event Management
 Sustainable Business

Graduate programs 
The graduate programs that are offered through Lang are:

 Graduate Diploma in Accounting 
 Master of Science in Management
 Master of Science in Marketing and Consumer Studies
 Master of Science in Tourism and Hospitality
 Master of Arts in Economics (with finance specialization option)
 Master of Arts in Leadership 
 Master of Business Administration in Hospitality and Tourism Management
 Master of Business Administration in Food and Agribusiness Management
 Master of Business Administration in Sustainable Commerce
 PhD in Economics
PhD in Management

Departments 
The Gordon S. Lang School of Business and Economics has four different departments, which include:
 Department of Economics & Finance
 Department of Management
 Department of Marketing & Consumer Studies
 School of Hospitality, Food & Tourism Management

Accreditations and rankings 
 Association to Advance Collegiate Schools of Business (AACSB)
Ranked in the top ten of Canadian business programs in Corporate Knights Survey for focus on corporate responsibility/sustainability 
 Bachelor of Commerce in real estate and housing is one of only two such undergraduate programs in Canada  
 School of Hospitality, Food and Tourism ranked 21st in the world and 1st in Canada for research output

Student associations 

 Gordon S. Lang School of Business and Economics Students' Association  
 Accounting Society of Guelph
 The Economics and Finance Association
 Leadership and Organizational Management Student Association
 Hospitality, Food and Tourism Management Student Association
 Marketing Society
 Government, Economics and Management Association
 Real Estate Students' Association (RESA)
 Guelph Entrepreneurship Society (GES)
 DECA U Guelph
 Jeux du Commerce Guelph (JDCC Guelph)
 Guelph Women in Leadership (GWIL)
 Guelph Sports Management Association (GSMA)

Gordon S. Lang 
Gordon S. Lang founded CCL Industries in Toronto in 1951. Today, CCL is a global company, the majority of CCL’s current sales come from abroad. The company’s 2018 revenue exceeded $4.7B with more than 20,000 employees worldwide at over 167 production facilities in 39 countries. It is the largest label company in the world.

References 

University of Guelph
Business schools in Canada
Accounting schools in Canada